Arctostaphylos luciana is a species of manzanita known by the common name Santa Lucia manzanita, is endemic to California.

Distribution
The woody plant is endemic to the southern Santa Lucia Mountains, in San Luis Obispo County.<ref name=jepson>[http://herbaria4.herb.berkeley.edu/eflora_display.php?tid=13941 Jepson Flora Project (eds.) 2014.  Jepson eFlora, http://ucjeps.berkeley.edu/IJM.html — Arctostaphylos luciana'] . accessed 15 January 2016.</ref>

It is found growing on ocean facing slopes in the upper boundary of the marine layer.

DescriptionArctostaphylos luciana is a shrub or small multi-trunked tree growing  in height.

Its leaves are glaucous−gray, waxy and woolly to smooth and hairless, with smooth edges.

The inflorescence is a cluster of pink and white, hairless, urn-shaped and downward facing "manzanita" flowers. The bloom period is from February to March.

Conservation
The species is listed on the California Native Plant Society Inventory of Rare and Endangered Plants as a fairly endangered and vulnerable species. Some populations are protected within the southern Cuesta Ridge Botanical Special Interest Area of the Los Padres National Forest.

See also
Arctostaphylos obispoensis — range adjacent atop Cuesta RidgeArctostaphylos pilosula — range nearby on east side of Cuesta Ridge''

References

External links
Calflora Database: Arctostaphylos luciana  (Santa Lucia manzanita)
Jepson Manual eFlora (TJM2) treatment of Arctostaphylos luciana
USDA Plants Profile for Arctostaphylos luciana (Santa Lucia manzanita)
UC Photos gallery — Arctostaphylos luciana

luciana
Endemic flora of California
Natural history of the California chaparral and woodlands
Natural history of San Luis Obispo County, California
~
~
Plants described in 1965